

Crown
Head of State (monarch) - Queen Elizabeth II

Federal government
Governor General - Michaëlle Jean

Cabinet
Prime Minister - Stephen Harper

28th Canadian Ministry
Minister of Finance - Jim Flaherty
Minister of Foreign Affairs - Lawrence Cannon
Minister of International Trade - Stockwell Day
Minister of National Defence - Peter MacKay
Minister of Health - Tony Clement
Minister of Industry - Maxime Bernier
Minister of National Revenue - Jean Pierre Blackburn 
Minister of Heritage - Josée Verner
Minister of Intergovernmental Affairs - Josée Verner
Minister of the Environment - John Baird
Leader of the Government in the House of Commons (House Leader) - Jay Hill
Minister of Justice - Rob Nicholson
Minister of Transport -  John Baird
Minister of Labour - Rona Ambrose
Minister of Citizenship and Immigration - Jason Kenney
Minister of Indian Affairs and Northern Development - Chuck Strahl 
Minister of Fisheries and Oceans - Gail Shea
Minister of Agriculture and Agri-Food - Chuck Strahl
Minister of Public Works and Government Services - Michael Fortier
Minister of Public Safety - Peter Van Loan
President of the Treasury Board - Vic Toews
Minister of Natural Resources - Gary Lunn
Minister of Human Resources and Skills Development - Diane Finley
Minister of Western Economic Diversification - Jim Prentice
Minister for International Cooperation – Bev Oda

Members of Parliament
See: 39th Canadian parliament, 40th Canadian parliament

Party leaders
Liberal Party of Canada - Michael Ignatieff (interim until May 2)
Conservative Party of Canada - Stephen Harper
Bloc Québécois - Gilles Duceppe
New Democratic Party - Jack Layton
Green Party of Canada - Elizabeth May

Supreme Court justices
Chief Justice: Beverley McLachlin
Marshall Rothstein
Michel Bastarache
William Ian Corneil Binnie
Louis LeBel
Marie Deschamps
Morris Fish
Louise Charron
Rosalie Abella

Other
Speaker of the Senate - Noël Kinsella
Speaker of the House of Commons - Peter Milliken
Governor of the Bank of Canada - David Dodge (until January 31), Mark Carney (February 1 on)
Chief of the Defence Staff - General Walter J. Natynczyk

Provinces & Territories

Lieutenant-governors
Lieutenant Governor of Alberta - Norman Kwong
Lieutenant Governor of British Columbia - Steven Point
Lieutenant Governor of Manitoba - John Harvard then Philip S. Lee
Lieutenant Governor of New Brunswick - Herménégilde Chiasson then Graydon Nicholas
Lieutenant Governor of Newfoundland and Labrador - John Crosbie
Lieutenant Governor of Nova Scotia - Mayann Francis
Lieutenant Governor of Ontario - David Onley
Lieutenant Governor of Prince Edward Island - Barbara Hagerman
Lieutenant Governor of Quebec - Pierre Duchesne
Lieutenant Governor of Saskatchewan - Gordon Barnhart

Premiers
Premier of Alberta - Ed Stelmach
Premier of British Columbia - Gordon Campbell
Premier of Manitoba - Gary Doer then Greg Selinger
Premier of New Brunswick - Shawn Graham
Premier of Newfoundland and Labrador - Danny Williams
Premier of Nova Scotia - Rodney MacDonald then Darrell Dexter
Premier of Ontario - Dalton McGuinty
Premier of Prince Edward Island - Robert Ghiz
Premier of Quebec - Jean Charest
Premier of Saskatchewan - Brad Wall
Premier of the Northwest Territories - Floyd Roland
Premier of Nunavut - Eva Aariak
Premier of Yukon - Dennis Fentie

Mayors
see also list of mayors in Canada
Charlottetown - Clifford J. Lee
Fredericton - Brad Woodside
Halifax - Peter J. Kelly
Iqaluit - Elisapee Sheutiapik
Toronto - David Miller
Ottawa - Larry O'Brien
Winnipeg - Sam Katz
Edmonton - Stephen Mandel
Quebec City - Régis Labeaume
Regina - Pat Fiacco
St. John's, Newfoundland and Labrador - Dennis O'Keefe
Victoria - Dean Fortin
Whitehorse - Bev Buckway
Yellowknife - Gordon Van Tighem

Religious leaders
Roman Catholic Archbishop of Quebec and Primate of Canada - Cardinal Archbishop Marc Ouellet
Roman Catholic Archbishop of Montreal -  Cardinal Archbishop Jean-Claude Turcotte
Roman Catholic Bishops of London - Bishop Ronald Peter Fabbro
Roman Catholic Archbishop of Toronto -  Archbishop Thomas Christopher Collins
Primate of the Anglican Church of Canada -  Fred Hiltz
Moderator of the United Church of Canada - David Giuliano
Moderator of the Presbyterian Church in Canada -  Wilma Welsh
National Bishop of the Evangelical Lutheran Church in Canada -  Raymond Schultz

Peer
Michael Grant, 12th Baron de Longueuil

See also
 2008 Canadian incumbents
 Events in Canada in 2009
 incumbents around the world in 2009
 Canadian incumbents by year

2009
Incumbents
Canadian leaders